Fustius s-forma is a moth of the family Erebidae first described by Michael Fibiger in 2010. It is known from Thailand.

The wingspan is about 13.5 mm. The head, patagia, anterior part of the tegulae, prothorax, basal part of the costa, triangular patch of the medial area and terminal area, including the fringes are black. The forewing is long and narrow, with a pointed apex. It has a brown ground colour. The crosslines are untraceable, except for the subterminal line which is weakly marked and beige. The terminal line is marked by black interneural dots. The hindwing is grey, with a narrow brown terminal line and an indistinct discal spot. The fringes are basally beige and distally grey. The underside of the forewing is grey brown, while the underside of the hindwing is light grey, with a discal spot.

References

Micronoctuini
Moths described in 2010
Taxa named by Michael Fibiger